Stoke City Football Club is an English association football club based in Stoke-on-Trent. Founded as Stoke Ramblers Football Club in 1863, the club changed its name to Stoke Football Club in 1868 and then added the word "City" in 1927. During the 1888–89 season, Stoke joined the Football League and after a period in non-league football prior to World War I Stoke remained there until 2008 when Stoke gained promotion Premier League.

Stoke City are founder members of the Football League, which was created in 1888. Over the years Stoke have played in the First Division, Second Division, Third Division, Third Division North, Championship, Football Alliance, Birmingham & District League and Southern League. As of 2018 Stoke compete in the second tier of English football, the EFL Championship.

Stoke's first opponent was West Bromwich Albion in September 1888 who defeated the Potters 2–0. Albion is also the opponent Stoke have played the most often in League matches, and against which they have recorded the most wins. The most league defeats inflicted upon City are by Liverpool and Sunderland. while the most drawn matches have come against Derby County.

Key
The records include the results of matches played in The Football League (from 1888 to 1890, 1891 to 1907, 1919 to 2008) Football Alliance (from 1890 to 1891) and the Premier League (since 2008). Wartime matches are regarded as unofficial and are excluded, as are matches from the abandoned 1939–40 seasons. Football League play-offs, Test Matches and cup matches are not included.
For the sake of simplicity, present-day names are used throughout: for example, results against Ardwick, Small Heath and Woolwich Arsenal are integrated into the records against Manchester City, Birmingham City and Arsenal, respectively.
  Teams with this background and symbol in the "Club" column are current divisional rivals of Stoke City.
  Clubs with this background and symbol in the "Club" column are defunct.
P = matches played; W = matches won; D = matches drawn; L = matches lost; F = Goals scored; A = Goals conceded; Win% = percentage of total matches won

All-time league record
Statistics correct as end of the 2021–22 season.

References

External links
 Stoke City official website

League Record By Opponent
Stoke City